Richard L. Grossman (August 10, 1943 – November 22, 2011) was best known for his work challenging the legality of corporate authority. According to Ralph Nader he 'pioneered the rediscovery of American corporate charter history'. He was the former Executive Director of Greenpeace USA, founder of Environmentalists for Full Employment, and former co-director of the Program on Corporations, Law and Democracy (POCLAD). He was co-author of Taking Care of Business: Citizenship and the Charter of Incorporation and Fear at Work. He lectured and organized widely on issues of corporate power, environmental justice, labor rights, and democracy.

Grossman attended Columbia University, graduating in 1965.  He then served as a Peace Corps volunteer in the Philippines. In 1968, he signed the "Writers and Editors War Tax Protest" pledge, vowing to refuse tax payments in protest against the Vietnam War.

See also 
 Corporate personhood

References

Further reading
 Charles Derber, Corporation Nation: How Corporations Are Taking Over Our Lives -- And What We Can Do about It, St. Martin's Press, 1998. 
 Ralph W. Estes & Ralph Nader, Taking Back the Corporation: A Mad as Hell Guide. 
 Ted Nace, Gangs of America: The Rise of Corporate Power and the Disabling of Democracy, Barrett-Koehler, 2005. 
 Dean Ritz (ed.), Defying Corporations, Defining Democracy: A Book of History & Strategies.

External links 
Lecture: Richard Grossman "Defining the Corporation, Defining Ourselves"
Model Amici Curiae Brief to Eliminate Corporate Rights
Interview with Richard Grossman - Bad Link
Conniff Interview with Richard Grossman
Barsamian interview, Challenging Corp Power
In Memoriam: Richard Grossman 1943-2011
Richard L. Grossman Obituary
Full Employment: A Solution for the Job Blackmail problem

Anti-corporate activists
American anti-globalization writers
American male non-fiction writers
American tax resisters
20th-century American philosophers
Peace Corps volunteers
Columbia College (New York) alumni
1943 births
2011 deaths